The 2020 Asian Men's Youth Handball Championship would have been the 9th edition of the Asian Men's Youth Handball Championship, a biannual championship in handball organised by the Asian Handball Federation (AHF).

It was originally scheduled to take place from 15 to 26 August 2020, but was postponed due to the COVID-19 pandemic.

On 22 February 2021, the AHF cancelled the tournament because of the pandemic.

Teams
Following 12 teams intended to participate in the championship.

References

External links

International handball competitions hosted by Kazakhstan
Handball competitions in Asia
Asia
Asian Handball Championships
Asian Men's Youth Handball Championship
Asian Men's Youth Handball Championship
Asian Men's Youth Handball Championship
Asian Men's Youth Handball Championship
Asian Men's Youth Handball Championship
Handball in Kazakhstan
H